The 1929–30 season of Alessandria Unione Sportiva's was their 14th in Italian football and their 13th in the top level of Italian championship, which in this season settled in a simple 18-teams tournament named Serie A.

The team of the 1928-29 season was almost entirely confirmed, except for the loss of Elvio Banchero, which signed for Genova 1893. The team played for the first time at the Campo del Littorio.

After the first seventeen rounds, the Grigis held a high-levels table position; from April to June, they met 7 defeats in 8 matches, and lost touch with the first positions, occupied by Ambrosiana and Genova 1893; they finished in sixth place. So far, it is the highest result reached by Alessandria in Serie A since its foundation (both with 1931-32).

In his last season with Alessandria U.S., Giovanni Ferrari scored 18 goals.

ClubManagementHonorary Chairman: Felice Bensa
Chairman: Ladislao Rocca
Consulors: A. Canestri, I. De Giorgis, G. De Negri, C. Isaia, A. Massobrio, G. Nascimbene, Giovanni Ronza
Secretary: Ugo BenziCoaching staff'''Coach: Carlo Carcano

Players

 Transfers 

 In 

 Out 

Profiles and statistics
Melegari (2005), p. 83

Matches

Serie A

Statistics

Results by round

Results summary

References

Sources

Ugo Boccassi, Enrico Dericci, Marcello Marcellini. Alessandria U.S.: 60 anni. Milano, G.E.P., 1973.
Mimma Caligaris. NovantAlessandria. Il Piccolo, Alessandria, 2002.
Fabrizio Melegari. Almanacco Illustrato del Calcio - La Storia 1898-2004''. Panini Edizioni, Modena, September 2005.

Alessandria
U.S. Alessandria Calcio 1912 seasons